A heart attack, or myocardial infarction, is when the blood supply to a part of the heart is interrupted.

Heart attack may also refer to:

An inaccurate reference to cardiac arrest (sudden cardiac death)

Film and television
Heart Attack (1960 film), an Australian TV play
Heart Attack (2014 film), an Indian film
Heart Attack (2015 film), a Thai film
"The Heart Attack", a 1991 episode of Seinfeld
"The Heart Attack" (The Golden Girls), a 1985 television episode

Music
Heart Attack (band), a New York hardcore band started in the early 1980s
The Heart Attacks, a glam punk band from Atlanta, Georgia
Heart Attack (EP), an extended play by AOA, along with the title track
Heart Attack (Krokus album), 1988
Heart Attack (Man Overboard album), and the title track, 2013
Heartattack, a music magazine by Kent McClard

Songs
"Heart Attack" (Demi Lovato song), 2013
"Heart Attack" (Enrique Iglesias song), 2013
"Heart Attack" (Noizy song), 2022
"Heart Attack" (Olivia Newton-John song), 1982
"Heart Attack" (Trey Songz song), 2012
"Heart Attacks", by Alkaline Trio from Is This Thing Cursed?
"Heart Attack", by the Asteroids Galaxy Tour from Out of Frequency
"Heart Attack", by Beenie Man from Undisputed
"Heart Attack", by Bronson featuring Lau.ra, from Bronson, 2020
"Heart Attack", by Darren Hayes from Spin
"Heart Attack", by the Eric Burdon Band from Power Company
"Heart Attack", by Flight Facilities featuring Owl Eyes from Down to Earth, 2014
"Heart Attack", by Grave Digger from Heavy Metal Breakdown
"Heart Attack", by Jonathan Seet from Melatonin
"Heart Attack", by Loona from Chuu
"Heart Attack", by Manafest from Fighter
"Heart Attack", by One Direction from Take Me Home, 2012
"Heart Attack", by Raven from Architect of Fear
"Heart Attack", by Scarlxrd
"Heart Attack", by Sleater-Kinney from Call the Doctor
"Heart Attack", by Steve Walsh from Glossolalia
"Heart Attack", by Sum 41 from All Killer No Filler
"Heart Attack", by Thin Lizzy from Thunder and Lightning
"Heart Attack", by Toxik from World Circus
"Heart Attack", by Tune-Yards from I Can Feel You Creep Into My Private Life

See also
 "This Heart Attack", a 2007 song by Faker